Prasat Bei (Khmer: ប្រាសាទបី, "three temples") is a temple with three brick towers in a north-south row, facing to the east, and standing on a laterite platform. The central tower contained a linga; the flanking towers reach no higher than the doorways. Only the lintels of the central and south towers were carved, both showing Indra on the elephant Airavata.

References 

Angkorian sites in Siem Reap Province